Stadaconé is the title of a 1976 album by the band Sloche.  With the exception of brief non-lyrical vocals in the title track, the album is entirely instrumental.

Track list 
"Stadaconé"  – 10:16
"Le Cosmophile"  – 5:40
"Il Faut Sauver Barbara"  - 4:18
"Ad Hoc"  – 4:28
"La Baloune De Varenkurtel Au Zythogala"  – 4:58
"Isacaaron (Le Démon Des Choses Sexuelles)"  – 11:21

Personnel 
 Réjean Yacola - Keyboards, Vocals
 Martin Murray - Keyboards, Saxophone
 Caroll Bérard - Guitars
 Pierre Hébert - Bass
 Gilles Chiasson - Drums

References

External links 
 Stadaconé at AllMusic

1976 albums
Sloche (band) albums